Rigoberto Esparza Morales (born 16 November 1983) is a Mexican football manager, who is the current manager of the Liga MX Femenil club Atlético de San Luis Femenil. He is a former professional footballer, who played as a midfielder.

Career
Esparza began his career with Toluca and their farm team Atlético Mexiquense. He made his professional debut with Durango in a 5–1 Ascenso MX win over Académicos on 12 January 2009.

Managerial career
Esparza was signed as the manager for Atlético de San Luis Femenil on 12 June 2020.

References

External links
 
 

1983 births
Living people
Footballers from Guadalajara, Jalisco
Mexican footballers
Mexican football managers
Deportivo Toluca F.C. players
Ascenso MX players
Liga MX Femenil managers
Association footballers not categorized by position